Sarah Johnson may refer to:

 Sarah Johnson (poet) (born 1980), South African poet
 Sarah Anne Johnson (born 1976), Canadian artist
 Sarah Johnson (Mount Vernon) (1844–1920), raised in slavery at Mount Vernon and then emancipated
 Sarah Stewart Johnson, American biologist, geochemist, astronomer and planetary scientist
 Sarah Johnson (swimmer) (born 1992), Northern Mariana Islands swimmer who participated in Swimming at the 2007 World Aquatics Championships – Women's 400 metre freestyle
 Sarah Marie Johnson (born 1987), American teenager convicted in the murder of Diane and Alan Scott Johnson, her parents